The 2016 NASCAR Camping World Truck Series was the 22nd season of the Camping World Truck Series, the third highest stock car racing series sanctioned by NASCAR in North America. It was contested over twenty-three races, beginning with the NextEra Energy Resources 250 at Daytona International Speedway and ending with the Ford EcoBoost 200 at Homestead-Miami Speedway. Johnny Sauter of GMS Racing won the driver's championship with three victories. Toyota won the manufacturer's championship with 14 wins and 32 points over Chevrolet.

This was the first year that the truck series (and the Xfinity Series) had a playoff system. Just like in the Cup Series, four drivers competed for the title in the final race at Homestead, also the final round of the playoffs. Those drivers are shown below.

2016 was the final year to feature RAM in competition. Despite losing factory support following the 2012 season, several independent teams continued to run RAMs until the body style aged out.

Teams and drivers

Complete schedule

Limited schedule

Notes

Changes

Teams
 JR Motorsports will run full-time with Cole Custer in the No. 00 Haas Automation Chevrolet Silverado after running part-time in 2015 because of age limitations. (The team made sporadic starts with Sprint Cup regulars in 2015 in preparation for 2016 at selected longer tracks.)
 ThorSport Racing will field a fourth full-time team with Ben Rhodes driving the No. 41 with a sponsorship from Alpha Energy. Rhodes raced part-time in the Xfinity Series for JR Motorsports in 2015.
 GMS Racing will field a third full-time team, with Johnny Sauter driving the No. 21 Chevrolet Silverado, after racing with ThorSport Racing for seven years from 2009-2015.
 NTS Motorsports will shut down its full-time team and just run part-time.
 Austin Wayne Self and team AM Racing will move up from the ARCA racing series in the No. 22.
 Martins Motorsports will field a full-time team with Tommy Joe Martins in the No. 44. The team purchased the owner points and some trucks of the 2015 Billy Boat Motorsports No. 15. Billy Boat Motorsports will shut down.
 Bolen Motorsports will field a full-time team with Jordan Anderson in the No. 66.
 SS-Green Light Racing will shut down the No. 08 team.
 Carlos Contreras and brother Enrique Contreras will form Contreras Motorsports and field a full-time team with various drivers in the No. 71 Truck.
 Hattori Racing Enterprises will attempt to run the full season with Ryan Truex.
 Ranier Racing with MDM will field a part-time team with Brandon Jones in the No. 99 Chevrolet. The team switched to the No. 71 in order to make the races due to rain threats.

Drivers
 Brad Keselowski Racing announced Daniel Hemric joins the team to drive the #19 Ford F-150 in 2016, ending a tenure with NTS Motorsports after one year in 2015. The truck was driven by Tyler Reddick in 2015. He'll switch from the No. 19 truck to the No. 29 truck in 2016.
 Kyle Busch Motorsports announced they will field three full-time trucks with William Byron and sponsor Liberty University in the No. 9, Christopher Bell and sponsor JBL in the No. 4 and Daniel Suarez with Arris sponsorship and Cody Coughlin with Jegs Performance Parts running at least 10 races each in the No. 51. Coughlin will drive the No. 18 truck at Daytona while Suarez drives the No. 51. 2015 NASCAR Camping World Truck Series champion Erik Jones ran full-time in 2015 in one truck, with multiple drivers in the other two trucks.
 Grant Enfinger and Kaz Grala will move up from the ARCA series to drive the No. 33 Chevrolet Silverado in 2016. The Truck was driven by multiple drivers in 2015.
 Rico Abreu will replace Johnny Sauter in the  ThorSport Racing No. 98. Abreu competed in the K&N Pro Series East series in 2015.
 Timmy Hill will run full-time for Premium Motorsports in the No. 49 (renumbered from No. 94). Hill ran 12 races in this truck in 2015.
 Travis Kvapil will run full-time for MAKE Motorsports in the No. 50. Kvapil ran 20 races for between the two MAKE trucks in 2015.
 Ben Kennedy and Red Horse Racing parted ways after three races.

Crew chiefs
 Brad Keselowski Racing will swap the crew chiefs of its two trucks, with Doug Randolph following Tyler Reddick to the No. 29 and Chad Kendrick moving to the No. 19.
Shane Huffman will crew chief the No. 17 Truck, driven by Timothy Peters. He was the crew chief of the GMS Racing No. 33 in 2015.
 Marcus Richmond will crew chief the new No. 21 Truck, driven by Johnny Sauter. He was the crew chief for Red Horse Racing's No. 17, driven by Timothy Peters in 2015.
 Jeff Hensley will crew chief the No. 23 Truck, driven by Spencer Gallagher. He was the crew chief for ThorSport Racing's No. 13, driven by Cameron Hayley in 2015.
 Jeff Stankiewicz will crew chief the No. 33 Truck, driven by Grant Enfinger. He was the crew chief for Spencer Gallagher's No. 23 in 2015.
 Kevin Bellicourt will crew chief the No. 41 Truck, driven by Ben Rhodes. He was the crew chief for K&N Pro Series East Champion William Byron in 2015.
 Kevin Manion will crew chief the No. 51 truck driven by Daniel Suarez and Cody Coughlin. He was the crew chief for Richard Petty Motorsports No. 9 Sprint Cup team in 2015.
 Ryan Fugle will crew chief the No. 9 truck driven by William Byron. He was the crew chief for 2015 champion Erik Jones in 2015.
 Jerry Baxter will crew chief the No. 4 truck driven by Christopher Bell. He was the crew chief for the No. 51 in 2015.
 Eddie Troconis will crew chief the No. 13 truck driven by Cameron Hayley. He was the engineer for 2015 champion Erik Jones in 2015.

Rule changes
The 2016 Camping World Truck Series season introduced several major changes:
A "caution clock" rule was in effect during all races, excluding the Eldora Dirt Derby due to its format. Under this system, a competition caution was thrown after twenty consecutive minutes of green flag racing. No free pass was awarded on these cautions, and the clock is reset upon all restarts. The clock was turned off during the final laps of the race (10 on Pocono and Mosport, 20 on all other tracks). The caution clock rule was replaced the following year with a new stage system, adopted by all three of NASCAR's national series.
 A playoff format similar to the Chase for the Cup used in the Sprint Cup Series was adopted.
Truck Series director Elton Sawyer also announced the availability of crate engines, known as the "Delta Engine", for teams to use starting with the Charlotte race.

Schedule

FS1 televised every race except Talladega, which aired on Fox. Due to programming overrun, coverage of Iowa started on Fox Business Network, while Michigan aired on FS2.

Results and standings

Races

Drivers' Championship

(key) Bold – Pole position awarded by time. Italics – Pole position set by final practice results or owner's points. * – Most laps led.

. – Eliminated after Round of 8
. – Eliminated after Round of 6

Owners' championship (Top 15)
(key) Bold - Pole position awarded by time. Italics - Pole position set by final practice results or rainout. * – Most laps led.
. – Eliminated after Round of 8
. – Eliminated after Round of 6

Manufacturers' championship

See also

 2016 NASCAR Sprint Cup Series
 2016 NASCAR Xfinity Series
 2016 NASCAR K&N Pro Series East
 2016 NASCAR K&N Pro Series West
 2016 NASCAR Whelen Modified Tour
 2016 NASCAR Whelen Southern Modified Tour
 2016 NASCAR Pinty's Series
 2016 NASCAR Whelen Euro Series

Notes
 Tommy Joe Martins qualified the No. 44 truck for the race, but crashed in qualifying. He contacted Austin Wayne Self and the No. 22 team, who initially didn't make the race, to run with the No. 44 but in Self's (Toyota) truck.
 The race at Charlotte Motor Speedway was postponed from May 20 to May 21 because of inclement weather.
 Because of chassis and body regulations, Ram is only eligible to race at circuits 1.25 miles or shorter (except Dover) and road courses that use the previous-generation body.  Fiat last submitted a truck in the 2012 season, before the current generation body used at longer tracks was used.

References

NASCAR Truck Series seasons